Iskenderbek Rysbekovich Aidaraliyev (born 13 November 1955) is a former Acting Prime Minister of Kyrgyzstan. He was appointed to that position on November 28, 2007, following the resignation of Almazbek Atambayev, and was replaced by Igor Chudinov on December 24, 2007, following the December 2007 parliamentary election. Previously, he was Acting First Deputy Prime Minister and had been Governor of Jalal-Abad Province from January 31, 2006 until November 27, 2007. Before that he had been Governor of Talas Province.

References

External links 

Prime Ministers of Kyrgyzstan
Living people
1955 births
People from Jalal-Abad Region